Jahangir Kabir ( is a Bangladeshi politician and journalist. He was the former Member of Parliament of Jhalokati-1, as a Jatiya Party candidate.

Early life and family
Kabir was born into a political Bengali Muslim family of landowners known as the Taluqdars of Chechrirampur in Kathalia, Jhalokati, then under the Backergunge District. The family traced their ancestry to Tendur Khan, a claimed descendant of Sultan Sher Shah Suri, who first settled in Faridpur from Sasaram. Tendur Khan then settled in Chechrirampur, and was given the taluq of Syedpur Pargana. Kabir's genealogy is as follows: Jahangir Kabir, son of Tafazzal Husayn Khan Tota Mia, son of Muazzam Husayn Khan Naya Mia, son of Ahsan Khan, son of Bhola Khan, son of Nasir Khan. His paternal uncle, Nurul Husayn Khan Nanna Mia, was an associate of Huseyn Shaheed Suhrawardy and editor for the All-India Muslim League Volunteers Force.

Career
Kabir was elected to parliament from Jhalokati-1 as a Jatiya Party candidate in 1986 and 1988.

References

Jatiya Party politicians
Living people
3rd Jatiya Sangsad members
4th Jatiya Sangsad members
Year of birth missing (living people)
Bangladeshi people of Afghan descent